Paranatama is a municipality/city in the state of Pernambuco in Brazil. The population in 2020 was 11,566 and the total area is 185.37 km2.

Geography

 State - Pernambuco
 Region - Agreste of Pernambuco
 Boundaries - Caetés   (N);  Saloá   (S);   Garanhuns   (E);  Pedra   (W).
 Area - 185.37 km2
 Elevation - 879 m
 Hydrography - Mundaú River
 Vegetation - Caatinga hipoxerófila
 Climate  -  Transition between tropical hot and humid and, semi arid hot
 Annual average temperature - 20.8 c
 Distance to Recife - 192 km

Economy

The main economic activity in Paranatama is agribusiness, especially cattle, goat, pig, sheep, and chicken farming; and plantations of beans, manioc, coffee and corn.

Economic Indicators

Economy by Sector
2006

Health Indicators

References

Municipalities in Pernambuco